Utar-Yelga (Utaryılğa) is a rural locality (a village) in Nizhnebaltachevsky Selsoviet, Tatyshlinsky District, Bashkortostan, Russia. The population was 54 as of 2010. There is 1 street.

Geography 
Utar-Yelga is located 19 km southeast of Verkhniye Tatyshly (the district's administrative centre) by road. Bigineyevo is the nearest rural locality.

References 

Rural localities in Tatyshlinsky District